Roland Wiesendanger (born 5 October 1961 in Basel) is a German physicist, specializing in nanoscience. Since 1993 he has been a full professor at the University of Hamburg, Germany.

He has been awarded three times in a row with the ERC Advanced Grant of the European Research Council as first scientist in Europe.

Early life and education
According to the CV published on his department website, Wiesendanger was born in Basel.

He grew up in Lörrach, Germany, where he attended high-school, the Hans-Thoma-Gymnasium from 1972  to 1981. He started studying physics, mathematics, and astronomy at the University of Basel, Switzerland in 1981. Since 1984 he had been working in the field of Scanning Tunneling Microscopy. In 1986, he graduated in Physics with highest distinction and in 1987, he received his Ph.D. with “summa cum laude” in experimental physics for his work on “Scanning Tunneling Microscopy on Non-Crystalline Solids”.

Career
Until his Habilitation degree in 1990, he set up a unique Surface Science Instrument (“NANOLAB-I”) which allowed for the simultaneous investigation of the structure, electronic and magnetic properties of surfaces at the atomic scale.

In 1992 Wiesendanger received an offer for a full professor position for Experimental Physics at the University of Hamburg, connected with the Foundation of the Microstructure Advanced Research Center Hamburg. 
He established a National Center of Competence in Nanotechnology.

Work
Wiesendanger is author or co-author of more than 600 scientific publications as well as several books.

In February 2021, he released a working paper and preprint, non-peer-reviewed publication suggesting that SARS-CoV-2 had escaped from a lab in Wuhan, a story which was picked up by many German news services including TV. Wiesendanger himself does not see his "study" as a formal scientific publication, but it "is intended to serve as information for a broad public in Germany".

Memberships and service
Since 2000 Wiesendanger is a member of the National Academy Leopoldina, since 2005 member of the Academy of Sciences in Hamburg, and since 2008 member of the German Academy of Science and Engineering (acatech). In 2012 he became Honorary Professor of the Harbin Institute of Technology (China) and in 2015 he received an Honorary Doctor degree from the Poznań University of Technology (Poland).

He has organized numerous international conferences like the International Scanning Tunneling Microscopy (STM’97) Conference in Hamburg (1997) or the 1st Otto Stern Symposium in Hamburg (2013). He has been a speaker at more than 500 international conferences, workshops and colloquia worldwide.

Selected awards and honors 
 1992: Gaede-Prize of the German Vacuum Society
 1992: Max Auwärter Prize
 1999: Karl Heinz Beckurts-Prize
 2000: Member of the National Academy Leopoldina
 2003: Philip Morris Research Prize
 2005: Member of the Academy of Sciences and Humanities in Hamburg
 2008: Member of the German Academy of Science and Engineering (acatech)
 2008: 1st ERC Advanced Grant
 2010: Nanotechnology Recognition Award of the American Vacuum Society
 2012: Fellow of the American Vacuum Society
 2012: Honorary Professor of the Harbin Institute of Technology, China
 2013: Foreign Member of the Polish Academy of Sciences
 2013: 2nd ERC Advanced Grant
 2014: Heinrich Rohrer Grand Medal
 2015: Honorary Doctor of the Poznań University of Technology, Poland
 2015: Hamburg Science Prize
 2015: International Fellow of the Surface Science Society of Japan
 2016: Julius Springer Prize for Applied Physics
 2018: 3rd ERC Advanced Grant
 2019: Honorary Medal „De Scientia et Humanitate Optime Meritis“ of the Czech Academy of Sciences

References

External links 
 Literature from and about Roland Wiesendanger
 Website of the research group of Roland Wiesendanger (http://www.nanoscience.de)

People from Lörrach
Living people
1961 births
University of Basel alumni
20th-century German physicists
21st-century German physicists
Academic staff of the University of Hamburg
Members of the German Academy of Sciences Leopoldina
Members of the Polish Academy of Sciences